Celes may refer to:

 Celes Ernesto Cárcamo (1903–1990), Argentine psychiatrist
 Celes Kobayashi, a former professional boxer
 Celes (grasshopper), a genus of the bandwing grasshopper
 Celes Chere, a female character in the video game  Final Fantasy VI
 Celestia "Celes" Ludenberg, a character in the video game Danganronpa: Trigger Happy Havoc

See also
Seles (disambiguation)

Unisex given names
Spanish unisex given names